Down on the Farm is a 1935 New Zealand film. It was New Zealand's first sound feature.

It is one of four films which lay claim to be the first "New Zealand talkie"; however The Devil's Pit and Hei Tiki had sound added in America, and On the Friendly Road was not released until 1936. Little footage and no script of the film have survived.

A comedy of farm life, the film was shot mainly in Otago and Southland, and most of the cast were from Dunedin. The story is about two rival farmers, who have to resolve their differences when their children fall in love.

Down on the Farm had its first public screening at midnight on 2 May 1935 in Dunedin. The report in the Otago Daily Times the next day commended the photography, production and acting, but found these achievements were "seriously circumscribed as a result of the dubious quality of the scenario". It described the leading actress, Daphne Murdoch, as "a very engaging star. She has the happy knack of photographing well at all times".

The film was not a financial success in New Zealand. It was unsuccessful in securing a release in the UK, where Cine Weekly said of it: "The dialogue is a joke, the acting amateurish and the photography poor. After this our colonial cousins will be well advised to restrict their exports to mutton."

References
New Zealand Film 1912–1996 by Helen Martin & Sam Edwards p45 (1997, Oxford University Press, Auckland)

External links
Down on the Farm at BFI
Surviving footage at Ngā Taonga Sound & Vision

1935 in New Zealand
1935 films
1930s New Zealand films
Lost New Zealand films